Algernon Kingscote defeated Eric Pockley in the final 6–4, 6–0, 6–3 to win the men's singles tennis title at the 1919 Australasian Championships.

Gordon Lowe was the champion of the 1915 edition, before the World War I interruption, but chose not to defend his title.

Draw

Finals

Top half

Section 1

Section 2

Bottom half

Section 3

Section 4

External links
 

 

Singles
1919 in tennis